Mārtiņš Peniķis (1874–1964) was a Latvian general and commander in chief of Latvian Army from 1928 to 1934. He was awarded with Order of Lāčplēsis and Order of the Three stars.

Biography 
Mārtiņš Peniķis was born 6 November 1874 at Atālmauli homestead, Turlava Parish, Courland Governorate in an ancient family of Curonian Kings. He studied at the Kuldīga city school.

In 1896 he enlisted in the Russian Imperial Army and served in the 133rd Simferopole Infantry Regiment. In 1900 he started studies in the war school and graduated in 1902. He was promoted to the rank of podporuchik and deployed to 121st Harkov Infantry Regiment. During the Russo-Japanese war he saw action in many battles including the Battle of Mukden. In 1913 he was admitted to the Nikolai Military Academy.

First World war 
In the early stages of the First World War Peniķis served as a company commander in Galicia and in battles around Kraków. He was wounded in December 1914. In 1915 he was promoted to the rank of colonel and participated in battles in Belorussia. In autumn of 1916 he was transferred to the Latvian Rifleman units and became commander of 2nd Riga Latvian Rifleman Regiment. He led  his regiment in the Christmas Battles and at the Battle of Jugla in autumn of 1917. After the October Revolution, Peniķis left the army and stayed in German-occupied Vidzeme, where he was interned. He was released in November 1918.

Latvian War of Independence 
In December 1918 he enlisted in the new Latvian Army and became the commander of Courland Military District. In June 1919 he became commander of all Latvian units around Liepāja. In September he became chief of the all military schools but when the attack of the Bermontians started he returned to active service. He became commander of the 2nd Vidzeme Infantry Division and replaced Jorģis Zemitāns as commander of the southern front. On 10 November, his division started a massive counterattack and liberated Torņakalns and other parts of Pārdaugava. Later he participated in the liberation of Latgale. In August 1920 Peniķis was promoted to general and became chief of the staff of the Latvian Army.

Later life 
From 1921 to 1924 Peniķis was general inspector of the army. From 1928 to 1934 he was commander in chief of the Latvian Army. In 1934 he reached the maximum service age and retired. In retirement he researched Latvian history and worked as military lecturer. He has published several books about military history.

During the Nazi occupation of Latvia in the World War II Peniķis was offered the post of general inspector of a newly formed Latvian Legion however he refused the offer. At the end of the Second World War he emigrated to Germany however in 1945 he decided to return to Soviet occupied Latvia. He was not repressed and continued to research military history. Mārtiņš Peniķis died on 18 February 1964 in Riga. He is buried at the Riga Forest Cemetery.

References 

1874 births
1964 deaths
People from Kuldīga Municipality
People from Courland Governorate
Latvian generals
Russian military personnel of the Russo-Japanese War
Russian military personnel of World War I
Latvian military personnel of the Latvian War of Independence
Recipients of the Order of Lāčplēsis
Burials at Forest Cemetery, Riga
Recipients of the Order of Saint Stanislaus (Russian)
Recipients of the Order of St. Anna
Recipients of the Order of St. George
Recipients of the Order of Polonia Restituta
Recipients of the Order of Vytautas the Great
Order of the White Rose of Finland